The Kites Museum of Indonesia (Museum Layang-Layang Indonesia) is a museum in Pondok Labu, South Jakarta. It is the first kites museum in Indonesia.  Its collection includes more than 600 kites.

History 
The museum was built by Endang Ernawati in 2003 because she likes kites. She collected types of kites from across Indonesia and throughout the world.

References 

 Museums in Jakarta
 Kite museums